Herbert Moford (August 6, 1928 – December 3, 2005) was an American right-handed pitcher in Major League Baseball for the St. Louis Cardinals (1955), Detroit Tigers (1958), Boston Red Sox (1959) and New York Mets (1962).

Moford spent each of his four major league seasons with a different team. His most significant year was 1958 with the Detroit Tigers, when he posted a 4–9 record with 58 strikeouts and a 3.61 ERA in 25 games pitched, including six complete games in 11 starts. In 157 career MLB innings, Moford had a 5–13 record with 78 strikeouts, a 5.03 ERA, and three saves. 
 
On April 11, 1962, Moford was one of four Met pitchers in the first game in franchise history, an 11–4 defeat against the St. Louis Cardinals at Busch Stadium. The other pitchers used by Mets' manager Casey Stengel were Roger Craig (the loser), Bob Moorhead and Clem Labine.

Moford was weak at the plate, posting a .045 batting average (2-for-44) in 50 appearances. He was perfect in the field, handling 44 total chances (8 putouts, 36 assists) without an error for a 1.000 fielding percentage.

He was married to Martha (Beckett) Moford. In May of 1977, their daughter, Mindy Moford, was killed in the Beverly Hills Supper Club fire in Southgate, Kentucky. He died in Cincinnati, at the age of 77.

References

Sources

Baseball Library
Kentucky Memories
Mets Database

1928 births
2005 deaths
Allentown Cardinals players
Baseball players from Kentucky
Boston Red Sox players
Charleston Senators players
Columbus Cardinals players
Columbus Red Birds players
Detroit Tigers players
Houston Buffaloes players
Johnson City Cardinals players
Lynchburg Cardinals players
Major League Baseball pitchers
Miami Marlins (IL) players
Minneapolis Millers (baseball) players
New York Mets players
Omaha Cardinals players
People from Brooksville, Kentucky
Rochester Red Wings players
St. Louis Cardinals players
Salisbury Cardinals players
Winston-Salem Cardinals players